Mark Napiorkowski (born August 24, 1962, in Toronto, Ontario) is a former professional Canadian football defensive lineman who played eight seasons in the Canadian Football League.

References

Career Stats

1962 births
Living people
Players of Canadian football from Ontario
Canadian football defensive linemen
BC Lions players
Hamilton Tiger-Cats players
Toronto Argonauts players
UBC Thunderbirds football players